Pontiac is an unincorporated community in Van Buren Township, Clay County, Indiana. It is part of the Terre Haute Metropolitan Statistical Area.

History
Pontiac was laid out in 1871 in anticipation of the railroad being built through it. It was named after Chief Pontiac.

Geography

References

Unincorporated communities in Clay County, Indiana
Unincorporated communities in Indiana
Terre Haute metropolitan area